Strul is a 1988 Swedish action comedy film directed by Jonas Frick.

Synopsis
Conny is a chemistry teacher who is framed for drug possession. Unable to prove his innocence he ends up in prison. When he finds a secret exit some inmates "persuades" him to participate in a heist. Things become extremely hectic as he tries to prove his innocence as well as "helping" his inmates. When Conny thinks that it couldn't possibly get any worse he meets Susanne, a policewoman...

Cast and characters

 Björn Skifs as Conny Rundqvist
 Gunnel Fred as Susanne Lindh
 Magnus Nilsson as Gränges
 Gino Samil as Hjelm
 Johan Ulveson as Pege
 Mikael Druker as Norinder
 Stefan Sauk as Alf Brinke
 Kåre Sigurdson as Sörman
 Hans Rosenfeldt as Glenn
 Peter Palmér as Hans Ekelund
 Thorsten Flinck as Prison guard
 Maud Hyttenberg as Old lady

External links
 
 

Swedish action comedy films
1988 films
1980s Swedish films